Joel Laslett Pott (born 20 January 1979 in Spilsby, Lincolnshire, England) is an English musician. He was the lead vocalist and guitarist of the indie band Athlete between 2000 and their split in 2013 and a songwriter.

Biography
While a child, he was bought some drums by his parents. These ultimately "didn't work out" and he was then given a nylon string guitar at the age of six. In his teenage years, he listened to British bands such as Blur, Radiohead and Oasis. He has cited Blur guitarist Graham Coxon as an influence on his own playing of the instrument.

Pott went to Trinity school in Stalybridge, Greater Manchester and then to Hillcrest School in Bellingham, near Catford in London, later studying graphic design, photography and English for his A levels at the Brit School of Performing Arts and Technology.

He considered attending the University of Edinburgh, but decided to move to Deptford, London, where he formed Athlete with childhood friends Carey Willetts, Steve Roberts and Tim Wanstall in 1999. Pott appeared on the BBC panel gameshow Never Mind the Buzzcocks on 15 November 2007.

Pott and his band Athlete have to date released four studio albums. These are Vehicles and Animals in 2003, which was nominated for a Mercury Music Prize award, Tourist in 2005, which reached number one in the UK Album Charts in its first week and included the band's highest charting song "Wires" at number four, Beyond the Neighbourhood in 2007 and Black Swan in 2009.

The band also have released three EPs which are titled Athlete, The Outsiders EP and The Getaway. The band have also released two live albums which includes a live recording from the band's show at Union Chapel performing their main hits stripped back to acoustic and more mellow titled Live at Union Chapel. The band's other live release was a ten-year anniversary live version of their debut album Vehicles and Animals Live recorded during a tour across the country.

The band continue to play occasional dates and small festivals whilst Pott has also been working with artists including George Ezra and London Grammar in writing songs. Athlete have stated that at this moment they do not intend to create a new album but have not ruled it out in the future.

Personal life
Pott married in 2000. From the relationship he has three children including a daughter called Myla. Although now healthy, she was born prematurely and is the subject of the Athlete song "Wires". Pott also wrote "Black Swan Song" after his grandfather, who fought in World War II, died in 2005.

Songwriting and production credits
Since 2011, Pott has co-written and produced tracks with a number of artists including George Ezra, London Grammar, James Bay, Gabrielle Aplin, Tom Walker and Shura. He was nominated for the 2015 Ivor Novello Awards as co-writer of the hit single "Budapest" by George Ezra.

References

External links
 Spotify Playlist
 Discography - Jax Management

1979 births
English male singers
English songwriters
English rock guitarists
English rock singers
Living people
People from Spilsby
English male guitarists
21st-century English singers
21st-century British guitarists
21st-century British male singers
People educated at the BRIT School
British male songwriters